Lim Pek Siah (born 8 October 1979) is a Malaysian former badminton player, who now works as a national badminton coach. Lim had won the women's doubles silver medal at the 1998 Commonwealth Games in Kuala Lumpur partnered with Chor Hooi Yee, also helped the team reach the final and clinch the silver medal. She made it to the women's doubles gold medal in 2002 Manchester with Ang Li Peng. She started her career as the women's doubles national coach in 2015.

Achievements

Commonwealth Games 
Women's doubles

Asian Championships 
Women's doubles

Southeast Asian Games 
Women's doubles

Asian Junior Championships 
Girls' doubles

Mixed doubles

BWF Grand Prix
The BWF Grand Prix has two levels: Grand Prix and Grand Prix Gold. It is a series of badminton tournaments, sanctioned by Badminton World Federation (BWF) since 2007. The World Badminton Grand Prix sanctioned by International Badminton Federation (IBF) since 1983.

Women's doubles

BWF International Challenge/Series 
Women's doubles

Mixed doubles

 BWF International Challenge tournament
 BWF International Series tournament
 BWF Future Series tournament

References

External links
 

1979 births
Living people
Badminton coaches
Malaysian sportspeople of Chinese descent
Malaysian female badminton players
Badminton players at the 1998 Asian Games
Badminton players at the 2002 Asian Games
Badminton players at the 2006 Asian Games
Asian Games competitors for Malaysia
Badminton players at the 1998 Commonwealth Games
Badminton players at the 2002 Commonwealth Games
Commonwealth Games gold medallists for Malaysia
Commonwealth Games silver medallists for Malaysia
Commonwealth Games medallists in badminton
Competitors at the 1995 Southeast Asian Games
Competitors at the 2001 Southeast Asian Games
Southeast Asian Games silver medalists for Malaysia
Southeast Asian Games bronze medalists for Malaysia
Southeast Asian Games medalists in badminton
Medallists at the 1998 Commonwealth Games
Medallists at the 2002 Commonwealth Games